Esther Kiplagat (born 8 December 1966) is a Kenyan long-distance runner. She competed in the women's 3000 metres at the 1992 Summer Olympics.

References

1966 births
Living people
Athletes (track and field) at the 1992 Summer Olympics
Kenyan female long-distance runners
Olympic athletes of Kenya
Place of birth missing (living people)
Kenyan female marathon runners